Frederick E. Gibson (born May 27, 1935) is a judge currently serving on the Federal Court of Canada.

References

1935 births
Living people
Judges of the Federal Court of Canada
People from Ottawa